Żabcze  is a village in the administrative district of Gmina Dołhobyczów, within Hrubieszów County, Lublin Voivodeship, in eastern Poland, close to the border with Ukraine.

Demography 
According to the 2011 National Census of Population and Housing, the population of Żabcze village is 224, of which 51.8% are women and 48.2% are men.  The town is inhabited by 3.8% of the commune's inhabitants. In the years 1998-2011 the number of inhabitants decreased by 27.0%. 57.1% of the inhabitants of the village of Żabcze are in the working age, 17.9% in the pre-working age, and 25.0% of the inhabitants are in the post-working age.

References

Villages in Hrubieszów County